Naicol Israel Contreras Salinas (born 5 April 2000) is a Venezuelan footballer who plays as a left-back.

Career

Club career
Contreras is a product of Deportivo Táchira. He got his professional debut for the club at the age of 17 on 1 May 2017 in the Venezuelan Primera División against Zamora. Contreras started on the bench, but replaced Jeizon Ramírez in the 28th minute. He left Táchira at the end of 2021.

References

External links
 

Living people
2000 births
Association football defenders
Venezuelan footballers
Venezuelan Primera División players
Deportivo Táchira F.C. players
People from San Cristóbal, Táchira
21st-century Venezuelan people